Pygicera scripta is a species of beetles in the family Buprestidae, the only species in the genus Pygicera.

References

Monotypic Buprestidae genera